The Well of Wisdom may refer to:

 In Norse mythology, at the foot of Yggdrasil, an ever-green ash-tree:
Urðarbrunnr, where the gods hold court
Mímisbrunnr, the place of Wóden's ordeal
Hvergelmir, the wellspring of cold
Connla's Well in Irish mythology, containing the Salmon of Wisdom